Tilt may refer to:

Music
 Tilt (American band), a punk rock group, formed in 1992
 Tilt (British band), an electronic music group, formed in 1993
 Tilt (Polish band), a rock band, formed in 1979

Albums
 Tilt (Cozy Powell album), 1981
 Tilt (Scott Walker album), 1995
 Tilt (Greg Howe and Richie Kotzen album), 1995
 Tilt (The Lightning Seeds album), 1999
 Tilt (Kahimi Karie album), 2000
 Tilt (Confidence Man album), 2022

Songs
 "Tilt" a 2008 song by In Flames from A Sense of Purpose
"Christine", also known as "Tilted", by Christine and the Queens, 2014

Film and television
 Tilt (1979 film), a 1979 American film
 Tilt (2011 film), a 2011 Bulgarian film
 Tilt (American TV series), a U.S. drama television series
 Tilt (Finnish TV series), a Finnish video gaming programme

Photography
 Tilt (camera), a cinematographic technique in which the camera is stationary and rotates in a vertical plane (or tilting plane)
 Tilt (view camera)
 Tilt–shift photography, use of selective focus, e.g., for simulating a miniature scene

Games and sports
 Tilt (arcade), a chain of video arcades inside various shopping malls
 Tilt (French magazine), a video game publication (1982–1994)
 Tilt (Finnish magazine), a video game publication (2004–2005)
 Tilt to Live, a mobile video game
 Tilt (poker), a poker term for a state of mental or emotional confusion or frustration in which a player adopts a less-than-optimal strategy
 Luke Tilt (born 1988), English football player
 A penalty condition in pinball
 Jousting encounter by horseback mounted competitors using lances

Other uses
 Tilt (wagon), a word for canopy on a wagon, boat or stall
 Axial tilt in astronomy
 Tilt.com, a crowdfunding company that rebranded to Tilt in 2014 from its former name of Crowdtilt
 Tilt (drink), an alcoholic beverage launched in the US market in August 2005
 Tilt (optics), a deviation in the direction of a beam of light
 Tilt (radio), a topical sketch show
 AT&T Tilt, a smartphone
 Tilt switch, an electrical switch
 Tilt table test, a medical procedure often used to diagnose dysautonomia or syncope
 Tilting train, a train with a mechanism for leaning
 Toxicant-induced loss of tolerance, a medical condition
 Tilting theory in mathematics, including tilting modules, tilted algebras, tilting functors, and so on
 Tilt (novel), a novel by Ellen Hopkins
 Tilts, a hamlet in South Yorkshire, England
 John Hancock Center's Tilting Observatory in Chicago, Illinois
 In the nomenclature of political forecasting, a "tilt" seat is one in which one particular party is deemed to have a very slight lead in electoral polls